The Dignity and Action Party (PDA) is a political party in Mauritania.

History
The party won one seat in the 2013 parliamentary elections.

References

Political parties in Mauritania